Love for Guala is the debut studio album by American rapper Flipp Dinero. It was released through We the Best Music Group/Cinematic Music Group/Epic Records on November 22, 2019, and is the follow-up to his 2017 extended play The Guala Way. It features guest appearances from Jay Critch, Kodak Black, Lil Baby and Rich the Kid. Its lead single "Leave Me Alone" peaked at 20 on the Billboard Hot 100 and was certified platinum by the Recording Industry Association of America.

Track listing 
Adapted from TIDAL.

Charts

See also
2019 in hip hop music

References

2019 debut albums
Albums produced by DJ Khaled
Albums produced by Tay Keith
Albums produced by Frank Dukes
Hip hop albums by American artists